Sebastián Rák (born 31 July 2003) is a Slovak professional footballer who currently plays as a forward for Veľké Ludince, on loan from ViOn Zlaté Moravce.

Club career

FC ViOn Zlaté Moravce
Rák made his Fortuna Liga debut for ViOn Zlaté Moravce against Žilina on 30 October 2021. Debuting at 18 years and 92 days, Rák became ViOn's 7th youngest player to debut in Slovak top tier.

Personal life
Rák is the son of a retired Slovak footballer Róbert Rák.

References

External links
 FC ViOn Zlaté Moravce official club profile 
 
 Futbalnet profile 
 

2003 births
Living people
Slovak footballers
Association football forwards
FC ViOn Zlaté Moravce players
Slovak Super Liga players